The Division of Rankin is an Australian Electoral Division in Queensland.

Geography
Since 1984, federal electoral division boundaries in Australia have been determined at redistributions by a redistribution committee appointed by the Australian Electoral Commission. Redistributions occur for the boundaries of divisions in a particular state, and they occur every seven years, or sooner if a state's representation entitlement changes or when divisions of a state are malapportioned.

History

The division was created in 1984 and is named after Dame Annabelle Rankin, the first Queensland woman elected to the Senate.

In its original form, Rankin covered the Gold Coast hinterland including Lamington National Park and the major town of Beaudesert as well as some outer metropolitan areas of Brisbane. In this situation it was a marginal seat held by the Labor party. However, with the transfer of the rural hinterland to Forde, Rankin became a much safer Labor seat, being one of only two Queensland seats the ALP retained in the 1996 election.

Today Rankin is based on the outer southern suburbs of the City of Brisbane, in addition to portions of the City of Logan.

Members

Election results

References

External links
 Division of Rankin (Qld) — Australian Electoral Commission

Electoral divisions of Australia
Constituencies established in 1984
1984 establishments in Australia
Federal politics in Queensland